Evan Dorkin (born April 20, 1965) is an American comics artist and cartoonist. His best known works are the comic books Milk and Cheese and Dork.  His comics often poke fun at fandom, even while making it clear that Dorkin is a fan himself.

Life and career
Dorkin was born in Brooklyn, New York, and moved with his family to Staten Island when he was 13 years old. He grew up reading superhero comics (being loyal to Marvel over DC), Mad magazine, and humor titles by Archie Comics and Harvey Comics. He became even more obsessed with comics when comic book retailer Jim Hanley opened a store location near his high school; Dorkin later ended up working there.

Dorkin aspired to attend the School of Visual Arts in the animation department, but was not accepted. (He had taken some animation classes at SVA while he was in high school.) Dorkin ended up attending New York University Tisch School of the Arts, but eventually switched his passion from animation to comics.

Dorkin's earliest published solo comics were Pirate Corp$ (later renamed Hectic Planet), published first by Eternity Comics and then Slave Labor Graphics from 1987 to 1989; and then a variety of Milk & Cheese titles, published by Slave Labor Graphics from 1991 to 1997.

As well as his comics work, Dorkin and his wife, Sarah Dyer, have written for Space Ghost Coast to Coast. Dorkin drew the cover art for several ska compilation albums in the 1990s. He wrote and produced an animated television pilot for Adult Swim titled Welcome to Eltingville, based on his own characters. He and Dyer wrote some episodes of the Superman: The Animated Series including the episode "Live Wire", which introduced a new character of the same name. Dorkin wrote the Superman and Batman: World's Funnest one-shot in 2000 which was drawn by various artists. Dorkin and Dyer worked as freelance writers on the 2006 English-language version of the anime Crayon Shin-chan, where they wrote material for the show's first six episodes. Dorkin co-created Beasts of Burden with Jill Thompson. Dyer has frequently colored Dorkin's art.

Awards
 2015 Eisner Awards: Won Best Single Issue (or One-Shot) (for Beasts of Burden: Hunters and Gatherers, with Jill Thompson)
 2010 Eisner Awards: Won Best Publication for Teens (for Beasts of Burden, with Jill Thompson)
 2005 Eisner Awards: Won Best Short Story (for "Unfamiliar", with Jill Thompson)
 2002 Eisner Award for Best Short Story (for "The Eltingville Club in 'The Intervention'" in Dork #9, Slave Labor Graphics)
 2002 Eisner Award for Best Writer/Artist: Humor (for Dork)
 2001 Harvey Award for Best Single Issue or Story (for Superman and Batman: World's Funnest, shared with various artists, DC Comics)
 1998 Eisner Award for Best Short Story (for "The Eltingville Club in 'The Marathon Men'" in Dork #4, Slave Labor Graphics)
 1996 Eisner Award for Best Short Story (for "The Eltingville Club in 'Bring Me the Head of Boba Fett'" in Instant Piano #3, Dark Horse Comics)

Nominations
 2011 Anthony Awards: Nominated for Best Graphic Novel
2002 Eisner Award for Best Humor Publication (for Dork #9)
2001 Harvey Award: Special Award for Humor (for Dork, Superman and Batman: World's Funnest, etc.)
2000 Ignatz Award for Outstanding Debut Comic (for Dork #8)
1999 Annie Award for Best Writing (for Space Ghost Coast to Coast: Episode- "Lawsuit")

Personal life
Dorkin is married to fellow comics writer/artist Sarah Dyer with whom he has a daughter named Emily.

Bibliography

Comics

Rom: Spaceknight — (first published art in the letters page of #37) Marvel Comics, 1982
Jim Higgins Fantastic Fanzine — Jim Higgins, 1984
Phigments — Amazing; Pied Piper Comics, 1987
Pirate Corp$ / Hectic Planet - Eternity Comics / Slave Labor Graphics, 1987–1989
The Real Ghostbusters - NOW Comics, 1988
Wild Knights - Eternity Comics, 1989
Milk and Cheese - Slave Labor Graphics, 1991–1997
Predator: Big Game - Dark Horse Comics, 1991
Bill & Ted's Bogus Journey (comic book adaptation) - Marvel Comics, 1991
Bill & Ted's Excellent Comic Book - Marvel Comics, 1992–1993
Predator: Bad Blood - Dark Horse Comics 1993
Fight-Man One Shot - Marvel Comics, 1993
Dork! - Slave Labor Graphics, 1993–present
Instant Piano - Dark Horse Comics, 1994
Generation ECCH! The Backlash Starts Here - Jason Cohen & Michael Krugman, Fireside Books, 1994
Justice League America Annual #8 - DC Comics, 1994  
The Mask: The Hunt for Green October - Dark Horse Comics, 1995
Superman Adventures #21 - DC Comics, 1998  
Superman Adventures #39 - DC Comics, 2000 
Superman and Batman: World's Funnest - DC Comics, 2000
Bizarro Comics - DC Comics, 2001
Captain America vol. 3 #50 - Marvel Comics, 2002  
Superman Adventures #65–66 - DC Comics, 2002  
Captain America: Red, White & Blue HC (two pages) - Marvel Comics, 2002  
 The Thing: Night Falls on Yancy Street, four-issue miniseries with artist Dean Haspiel - Marvel Comics, 2003
Bizarro World - DC Comics, 2005
Dose - Bankshot Comics, 2007
The Dark Horse Book of Hauntings (story "Stray") by Evan Dorkin and Jill Thompson.
The Dark Horse Book of Witchcraft (story "The Unfamiliar") by Evan Dorkin and Jill Thompson.
The Dark Horse Book of The Dead (story "Let Sleeping Dogs Lie") by Evan Dorkin and Jill Thompson.
The Dark Horse Book of Monsters (story "A Dog and His Boy") by Evan Dorkin, Sarah Dyer, and Jill Thompson.
Beasts of Burden (four-issue mini-series) by Evan Dorkin and Jill Thompson.
Hellboy/Beasts of Burden: Sacrifice (one-shot) by Evan Dorkin, Mike Mignola, and Jill Thompson.
Dark Horse Presents vol. 2 #4 (story "Food Run") by Evan Dorkin and Jill Thompson.
Dark Horse Presents vol. 2 #6 (story "Story Time") by Evan Dorkin and Jill Thompson.
Dark Horse Presents vol. 2 #8 (story "The View From The Hill") by Evan Dorkin and Jill Thompson.
Beasts of Burden: Neighborhood Watch (three stories from Dark Horse Presents) by Evan Dorkin and Jill Thompson.
The Eltingville Club - Dark Horse Comics, 2014

Role-playing games
GURPS Fantasy Folk
GURPS Middle Ages I

Television

Space Ghost Coast to Coast (TV series), 1994–1999
 "Gum, Disease"
 "Girlie Show"
 "Jerk"
 "$20.01"
 "Sharrock"
 "Switcheroo"
 "Cookout"
 "Art Show"
 "Woody Allen's Fall Project" ("Girlie Show")
 "Anniversary"
 "Pilot"
 "Zorak"
 "Hipster"
 "Telethon"
 "Lawsuit"
 "Sequel"
 Superman: The Animated Series (1997–98)
 "Livewire"
 "Monkey Fun"
 "Little Girl Lost" (parts 1 & 2)
Welcome to Eltingville (TV pilot), 2002
Yo Gabba Gabba! (various episodes), 2007-2013
 Ben 10
 "Xingo"

References

External links

Evan Dorkin and Sarah Dyer's House of Fun
Big Mouth Types Again - Dorkin's LiveJournal

Evan Dorkin at the Unofficial Handbook of Marvel Comics Creators
Complete list of Dorkin's work for MAD magazine
Interview on the Super Live Adventure Podcast Part 1 and Part 2

1965 births
20th-century American artists
21st-century American artists
Album-cover and concert-poster artists
Alternative cartoonists
American bloggers
American comics artists
American comics writers
American male bloggers
American male television writers
American television writers
DC Comics people
Eisner Award winners for Best Writer/Artist
Eisner Award winners for Talent Deserving of Wider Recognition
Harvey Award winners
Living people
Marvel Comics people
People from Brooklyn
People from Staten Island
Role-playing game artists
Screenwriters from New York (state)